The Olympus Zuiko Digital ED 35-100mm 1:2.0 is an interchangeable camera lens announced by Olympus Corporation on February 17, 2005.

References
http://www.dpreview.com/products/olympus/lenses/oly_35-100_2/specifications

External links
 

Camera lenses introduced in 2005
035-100mm f 2.0 ED